Jianxi District is a district of the city of Luoyang, Henan province, China.

Jianxi District established in July 1955, locate the west of Jian River and Xigong District is east by the Jian River. Jiangxi is a manufacturing center.

Administrative divisions
As 2012, this district is divided to 11 subdistricts.
Subdistricts

References

 

Districts of Luoyang